Joseph Kopsky (November 4, 1882 – January 30, 1974) was an American cyclist. He was born in New York City. He competed in two events at the 1912 Summer Olympics. On May 5, 1912, he set a record for 150 miles, in 8:26.27. He moved to Miami, Florida, after World War Two. In 2001 he was inducted into the United States Bicycling Hall of Fame.

References

External links
 

1882 births
1974 deaths
American male cyclists
Olympic cyclists of the United States
Cyclists at the 1912 Summer Olympics
Sportspeople from New York City